Dardan Çerkini (born 27 September 1991) is a Kosovar footballer who plays as a defender for FC Ferizaj in the Football Superleague of Kosovo.

Career
Çerkini re-joined KF Ferizaj on 31 January 2019.

References

1991 births
Living people
People from Ferizaj
Kosovo Albanians
Association football defenders
Kosovan footballers
KF Ferizaj players
FC Drita players
Flamurtari Vlorë players
KF Trepça'89 players
Football Superleague of Kosovo players
Kategoria Superiore players